Chamaita niveata is a moth of the family Erebidae first described by Walter Rothschild in 1913. It is found in New Guinea.

References

Nudariina
Moths described in 1913